The 15th installment of the annual Metro FM Music Awards is an award ceremony that celebrates excellence in the South African music industry by honouring musicians who did exceedingly well in their field throughout 2015. The show first aired on SABC 1 on February 27, 2016.

The winner in each category will  receive a R100,000 prize for each category they win. Metro FM is investing in musicians; building wealth and benefiting financially from their trade over and above the artistic recognition that comes with the MMA's coveted statuette. This will be the first installment of the award show to include a new category, namely the Pan-African Category.

Nathi and Sphectacular & DJ Naves led the nominations with five each, followed by Riky Rick and Emtee with four nominations each, and AKA, Fifi Cooper and Black Coffee with three nominations each.

Emtee is the biggest winner of the event, having won in four categories. AKA won three awards, one of which he shares with newcomer Emtee.

Winners and nominees

References 

African music awards
South African music awards